Lasiopetalum molle, commonly known as soft leaved lasiopetalum, is a species of flowering plant in the family Malvaceae and is endemic to the south-west of Western Australia. It is an erect or spreading subshrub or shrub with hairy stems, thick and stiff egg-shaped leaves and pink flowers.

Description
Flowering occurs from July to October.

Taxonomy
Lasiopetalum molle was first formally described in 1863 by George Bentham in Flora Australiensis from specimens collected by James Drummond in the Swan River Colony. The specific epithet (molle) means "soft".

Distribution and habitat
This lasiopetalum grows in open mallee woodland from Wongan Hills to Newdegate in the Avon Wheatbelt and Mallee biogeographic regions of south-western Western Australia.

Conservation status
Lasiopetalum molle is listed as "not threatened" by the Government of Western Australia Department of Biodiversity, Conservation and Attractions.

References

molle
Malvales of Australia
Rosids of Western Australia
Taxa named by George Bentham
Plants described in 1863